The Schaefers Building, located in Eugene, Oregon, is listed on the National Register of Historic Places. It was designed by Truman Phillips.

See also
 National Register of Historic Places listings in Lane County, Oregon

References

External links
 

Art Deco architecture in Oregon
Buildings and structures completed in 1929
Buildings and structures in Eugene, Oregon
National Register of Historic Places in Eugene, Oregon